Caspar Creuziger, also known as Caspar Cruciger the Elder (1 January 1504 – 16 November 1548), was a German Renaissance humanist and Protestant reformer. He was professor of Theology at the University of Wittenberg, preacher at the Castle Church (Wittenberg, Germany), secretary to and worked with Martin Luther to revise Luther's German Bible translation.

Life

Born in Leipzig, Creuziger entered the University of Leipzig at age 12, where he studied under Peter Mosellanus. The outbreak of the plague drove him to Wittenberg in 1521, where he completed his studies in the Hebrew language.

In 1525, he became Rector at Magdeburg's Johannisschule. He was called to the faculties of Philosophy and Theology at Wittenberg in 1528, where he lectured in both disciplines, preached at the Castle Church and wrote faculty opinions. He received his doctorate from Wittenberg in 1533. He continued to teach exegesis, dogmatics and edited instructional materials. During these years, Martin Luther included him in the reformer's circle of translators, who assisted him in revising the German Bible version.

In 1539, Creuziger assisted Leipzig in introducing reforms. He served as a delegate to theological convocations at Hagenau, Worms and Regensburg. When other theologians fled the Schmalkald War, he remained at his post.

Creuziger also edited the Wittenberg edition of Luther's Works and helped to draft the Leipzig Interim.

He died at Wittenberg in 1548.

Family

In 1524 he married the former nun Elisabeth von Meseritz - they had one daughter (Elisabeth, who married rector Kegel and then, on his death, Luther's son Hans in Eisleben) and one son (Caspar Cruciger the Younger).

Notes

Bibliography 
 In epistolam Pauli ad Timotheum priorem Commentarius
 Enarratio Psalmi 116–118
 Der XX. Psalm für christliche Herrschaft zu beten
 In Evangelium Johannis Apostoli Enarratio
 Enarratio Psalmi: Dixit Dominus [110] et aliquot sequentium
 Comment. in Matthaeum
 In Epistolam Pauli ad Romanos Commentarius
 De iudiciis piarum Synodorum sententia
 Enarrationis Symboli Nicaeni articuli duo, de Synodis et tribus personis Divinitatis.

1504 births
1548 deaths
16th-century German Lutheran clergy
German Lutheran theologians
German Protestant Reformers
German Renaissance humanists
German scholars
Linguists from Germany
Lutheran biblical scholars
Clergy from Leipzig
Translators of the Bible into German
Academic staff of the University of Wittenberg
Cruciger family